Valentine Djeikui Ngaham (born 22 January 1990 in Bamenda) is a professional Cameroonian footballer last playing for NK Domžale.

Career
Ngaham began his 2004 career by Young Stars Academy de Bamenda and joined on 21 February 2008 to NK Domžale.

References

 NK Domžale squad for the second half of 2007–2008 season at ekipa.org.

1988 births
Living people
Cameroonian footballers
Association football midfielders
NK Domžale players
Expatriate footballers in Slovenia
Cameroonian expatriates in Slovenia
People from Bamenda